Bristow is an unincorporated community of Prince William County in Northern Virginia about  from Washington, D.C. In 2014, Bristow's postal area population was 29,346, a 287% increase since 2000; however, the Bristow community is formally included in the Linton Hall, Virginia census-designated place (CDP).

Bristow is home to Jiffy Lube Live outdoor concert stage which was formerly known as the Nissan Pavilion.

Bristow was voted "Best Place for Homeownership in Virginia" by the Nerd Wallet.

Demographics
As of the census of 2000, there were 8,910 people, 2,964 housing units, and 9,188 families living in the town. The racial makeup of the town was 87.62% White, 6.73% Black, 2.57% Asian, 0.18% Native American, 0.12% Pacific Islander, and 1.04% from other races. Hispanic people of any race were 3.86% of the population.

The area is mostly upper-middle-class residential managed communities including Braemar Community, Bridlewood, Bridlewood Manor, Brookside, Crossman Creek, Foxborough, Kingsbrooke, New Bristow Village, Lanier Farms, Saybrooke, Sheffield Manor, Amberleigh Station, and Victory Lakes.

History
The majority of the Bristow Area was previously part of the Linton's Ford plantation, owned by the Linton family from the 18th century.  In 1894, Sarah Linton converted to Catholicism and became a Benedictine nun, and she donated the property to the Roman Catholic Church, to be used to establish schools for poor girls and boys.

Linton Hall Military School was founded in 1922, for which the main road was named: Linton Hall Road.  In 1989, the school ended its military and boarding programs and became coeducational; it had already been renamed Linton Hall School many years earlier.  In the late 20th century, much of the original property was sold to developers.

Population increased in the Bristow area, and increased enrollment for the school.

The Linton family (with the exception of Sarah) are buried in the Linton Family Cemetery in the Braemar Community.  The cemetery is legally unowned due to a loss of records when the Brentsville Courthouse burned in the Civil War.  However, maintenance is provided by the Braemar Community Association with coordination with the Benedictine Sisters at Linton Hall.

Geography and climate

According to the Geographic Names Information System, Bristow has also been known as Briscoe, Bristoe, Bristoe Station, and Bristow Station. The Board on Geographic Names officially decided upon Bristow as the community's name in 1906.

The Brentsville Historic District and Davis-Beard House are listed on the National Register of Historic Places.

The former village proper was located on SR 619, Bristow Road, about 1 mile southwest of the intersection with SR 28, Nokesville Road, at the Norfolk Southern Railway crossing. There are a few businesses left at this location, and a crew change point for the railroad is just up the tracks from the railroad crossing.  The new town center has, in general, relocated farther west around the Braemar Parkway area.

Development

There has been major development since 2000 in both residential and commercial business that are continuing to expand.  Bristow Manor Golf Club has a course, driving range and putting green.  It was voted by Golf Digest as one of "Top 100 Places to Play from 1998-2000".

Media
The Bristow Beat online publication covers local news.

Transportation

Highway 
Major highways that connect Bristow include Virginia Route 28, Virginia Route 234 and Virginia Route 215.

Rail 
Bristow is served by the Broad Run/Airport Virginia Railway Express station, which is in the southern-tier of the community. The station offers weekday service to inner suburbs in Fairfax County, Virginia and to Washington, D.C.

Air
The Manassas Regional Airport is located in the City of Manassas, adjacent to Bristow, and serves the area. There are no scheduled fights to the airport.

Bike/Walking 
There are numerous mixed use walking/biking paths scattered around the various suburban neighborhoods.

Notable people
 Humayun Khan, soldier who died in combat in 2004
 Lucky Whitehead, Dallas Cowboys wide receiver
 Greg Stroman, Washington Football Team defensive back

See also
Battle of Bristoe Station
Jiffy Lube Live

References

External links 
 Prince William County Government

Unincorporated communities in Prince William County, Virginia
Washington metropolitan area
Unincorporated communities in Virginia